Ledečko is a municipality and village in Kutná Hora District in the Central Bohemian Region of the Czech Republic. It has about 200 inhabitants.

Administrative parts
The village of Vraník is an administrative part of Ledečko.

In popular culture
The 1403 recreation of the villages, called Ledetchko and Vranik, were featured in Czech role-playing game Kingdom Come: Deliverance.

References

Villages in Kutná Hora District